The Škoda VOS is a full-size luxury car produced by the Czechoslovak automaker AZNP at their plant in Mladá Boleslav between 1949 and 1952. For a few years it was the preferred car for senior political and military personnel in Czechoslovakia. It was never sold to the general public.

Background
In 1949 the plant at  Mladá Boleslav assembled the last Škoda Superbs, large six-cylinder limousines evoking the style of American cars in the late 1930s. The authorities needed a more modern replacement and instructed Škoda to develop one.   This was the car that would become the Škoda VOS. The letters VOS indicated a "special car for the government" in Czech or Slovak (Vládní Osobní Speciál or Vládny Osobný Špeciál).

The car
The car went into production in 1950 with the coach builder (even then better known as a producer of buses) Karosa: final assembly took place at Škoda's own plant. The form of the car was unremarkable, despite having been designed by Oldrich Meduna whose reputation till that point came from his work designing military tanks. The mechanical architecture was also conventional, with a front-mounted engine driving the rear wheels.

More remarkable, at least in terms of European cars of the time, was a large 5.2-litre engine delivering .  The engine came from a Praga truck. Because of the weight of the armour plating, the standard car weighed nearly 4 tons, however. The top speed was restricted to 80 km/h (50 mph) on the orders of the interior ministry. A "Light-weight" version without all the armour plating was also listed.

Unusually for the time, the car was fitted with air-conditioning. However, the air conditioning mechanism occupied most of the space in the boot/trunk, and it became common for dignitaries moving by VOS to travel followed by a second car to carry luggage.

Celebrity connections
Famous owners included President Gottwald, Enver Hoxha, Zhu De, Ana Pauker and Mao Zedong.

Ana Pauker, the infamous female communist leader of the Romanian Workers' Party (later to become the Romanian Communist Party ) had a Škoda VOS built for running on tracks, reaching speeds of up to 115 km/h with a total weight of 5 tons. The model is now up for display in the train Station of Sinaia. The driver's secure wind shield is smashed after a supposed attempted attack on the lady also known as "Stalin with skirt" near the Roşiori Nord train station.

The end
Production of the VOS ended in 1952, by when 107 had been built. Škoda were not invited to replace the car, and the nation's political elite switched their allegiance to the Tatra 603.

References

Sources
Bernard Vermeylen, Voitures des pays de l'Est, Boulogne-Billancourt, ETAI, 2008, 239 p. (OCLC 470767381)
KRÁLÍK, Jan: Utajené projekty Škoda; GRADA Publishing 2007, 
CEDRYCH, Mario René & NACHTMANN, Lukáš: ŠKODA – auta známá i neznámá; GRADA Publishing 2003, 
Škoda VOS: Pro bolševiky od Prahy po Peking

External links
 Škoda VOS in Škoda Auto museum 2003
 Picture of Škoda VOS

VOS
1950s cars
Rear-wheel-drive vehicles
Full-size vehicles
Luxury vehicles
Sedans
Cars introduced in 1949